Thomas Boleyn, Earl of Wiltshire, 1st Earl of Ormond, 1st Viscount Rochford KG KB (c. 1477 – 12 March 1539), of Hever Castle in Kent, was an English diplomat and politician who was the father of Anne Boleyn, the second wife of King Henry VIII, and was thus the maternal grandfather of Queen Elizabeth I. By Henry VIII he was made a knight of the Garter in 1523 and was elevated to the peerage as Viscount Rochford in 1525 and in 1529 was further ennobled as Earl of Wiltshire and Earl of Ormond.

Origins
He was born in about 1477 at Blickling Hall in Norfolk, the son of Sir William Boleyn (1451–1505) of Blickling (purchased by Sir William's father Sir Geoffrey Boleyn, a wealthy mercer who served as Lord Mayor of London) by his wife Margaret Butler (1454–1539), a daughter and co-heiress of Thomas Butler, 7th Earl of Ormond.

Marriage and issue
Around 1500, he married Elizabeth Howard, eldest daughter of Thomas Howard, Earl of Surrey by his wife Elizabeth Tilney. Six children are attested, only three of whom survived childhood:

 Mary Boleyn (c. 1499/1500 – 19 July 1543); Mary Carey (1520–1528); Mary Stafford (1534–1543); Mary's second husband, William Stafford, was knighted in 1545 – two years after his wife's death in 1543.
 Thomas Boleyn the younger (died after 1506) died young; 
 Henry Boleyn (died after 1506) died young;
 George Boleyn, Viscount Rochford (c. 1504 - 17 May 1536), eldest surviving son and heir apparent who predeceased his father, having been executed in 1536 together with his sister the queen. From 1529 he used his father's junior title of Viscount Rochford as a courtesy title.
 Anne Boleyn (c.1501 – 19 May 1536); later Marchioness of Pembroke (1532–1536); later Queen Consort of England (1533–1536)

Diplomatic career
In his youth, Thomas Boleyn was active in the court of Henry VII. He attend the wedding of Prince Arthur with Catherine of Aragon.  In 1503 he was part of Princess Margaret Tudor’s escort, to Scotland, to marry King James IV. He was created a Knight of the Bath at the coronation of Henry VIII in 1509.

His appointment in 1512 as ambassador to the Low Countries brought him into contact with the regent Archduchess Margaret of Austria. Like Thomas, Margaret of Austria spoke French and Latin and they got along well enough for her to accept his daughter, Anne, as a maid of honour.

Through his ability and the connections of his extended family, Thomas Boleyn became one of Henry VIII's leading diplomats. Known appointments and missions included:
1511 and 1517: Sheriff of Kent.
1512: One of a party of three envoys to the Netherlands.
1518–1521: ambassador to France, where he was involved in arrangements for the "Field of Cloth of Gold" meeting between Henry and the new French King Francis I in 1520.
1521 and 1523: Envoy to Holy Roman Emperor Charles V.
1527: One of a large envoy to France.
1529: Envoy to a meeting of Holy Roman Emperor Charles V and Pope Clement VII, to seek support for the marriage annulment of Henry VIII and Catherine of Aragon. This was followed by another envoy to France.

Titles obtained
Boleyn was invested as a Knight of the Garter in 1523.

Boleyn's claim to his other titles derived from his mother, Lady Margaret Butler who was the younger daughter and co-heiress of Thomas Butler, 7th Earl of Ormond. Thomas Butler, as an Irish peer, should only have sat in the Parliament of Ireland. However, as a personal friend of Henry VII he was summoned to the English parliament in November 1488 as "Thomas Ormond de Rochford, chevaler". At this time, he was already 8th Earl of Carrick and 7th Earl of Ormond.

In English law, matrilineal descent is not considered valid for earldoms, and in Brehon law, then largely still in use in Ireland, new leaders were chosen by election. These customs were, in Boleyn's case, outweighed by a more important consideration – he was the father of two daughters. Henry VIII had affairs first with Boleyn's elder daughter Mary, then with his younger daughter, Anne. Boleyn's ambition was so considerable that unsubstantiated rumours had it that he allowed his wife to have an affair with the king, but those rumours were intended to steer the king away from marrying Anne, and even suggested that she was his own daughter. When it was claimed that Henry had had an affair with both Anne's sister and mother, the king replied to the rumours, "Never with the mother."

In 1525, Henry VIII became enamoured of Anne and began pursuing her. Her father was elevated to the peerage as Viscount Rochford on 18 June 1525. The title referred to the "barony" of Rochford supposedly created in 1488 for his grandfather. The title had fallen into abeyance as Ormond had died without any male heir in 1515. Boleyn is often thought of as a power hungry, ambitious and scheming man who sacrificed his daughters for personal gain, but his biographer, Lauren Mackay, has argued that he enjoyed a highly successful career as an ambassador and courtier years before his daughters caught the King's eye. As Henry's passion for Anne intensified, so did her father's titles, though these rewards were not solely due to Anne but also Boleyn's own merit. Henry pressured the main claimant to the earldom of Ormond, Piers Butler, to renounce all his claims to the titles in 1529. Piers Butler was rewarded by being created Earl of Ossory five days later.

Boleyn's claims to the Earldom of Wiltshire also depended upon his Irish relatives. This time, he had to go back to his maternal great-grandfather, James Butler, 4th Earl of Ormond, to establish a claim. While James Butler was indeed the 1st Earl of Wiltshire (of the third creation), on 1 May 1461 he lost his titles and his life when he was executed by the victorious Yorkists. The title was subsequently revived (in fourth and fifth creations) and bestowed on people unrelated to the Butlers of Ormond. This did not prevent the creation of the earldom for the 6th time. On 8 December 1529 Thomas Boleyn, Viscount Rochford, was created Earl of Wiltshire and Earl of Ormond.

Also on 8 December 1529, the Earl of Wiltshire's only surviving son, George, was granted the courtesy title of Viscount Rochford. His title of Viscount, although initially a courtesy title, ceased to be a mere courtesy title sometime before 13 July 1530. On 17 May 1536, Lord Rochford was executed for treason, and all his titles were forfeited. His widow, Jane, Viscountess Rochford, however, continued to use the title after her husband's death. Lady Rochford was herself attainted for treason and beheaded at Tower Green (not Tower Hill) within the Tower of London on 13 February 1542 with Henry VIII's fifth wife, Queen Catherine Howard.

Boleyn was appointed Lord Privy Seal in 1530. In 1532, his daughter Anne was granted a peerage, being created Marquess of Pembroke in her own right, before marrying Henry the following year and becoming queen consort. Boleyn acquiesced in Anne's judicial execution and that of her brother Lord Rochford when Henry discarded her in favour of his third wife, Queen Jane Seymour.

At this point Boleyn was replaced as Lord Privy Seal and left in disgrace until his death a few years later. He suffered a final indignity when the claims of Piers Butler to the Earldom of Ormond were recognized and he again became Earl of Ormond from 22 January 1538. There were two earls of Ormond in the Kingdom until his death on 12 March 1539.

Death and burial
He died at Hever Castle on 12 March 1539 and was buried in St. Peter's Church, Hever, where survives his elaborate monumental brass. He is depicted dressed in full robes wearing the insignia of a Knight of the Garter, with the Badge on his left breast and the Garter around his left knee. His head rests on a helm surmounted by a crest of a falcon displayed (his daughter's heraldic badge) and his feet rest on a griffin. The inscription reads: .

In popular culture
Thomas Boleyn has been portrayed by Sir Michael Hordern in Anne of the Thousand Days (1969), by Benjamin Whitrow in Henry VIII, and by Jack Shepherd and Mark Rylance in the 2003 and 2008 film versions of The Other Boleyn Girl, respectively.  The 2007 Showtime series The Tudors has Nick Dunning in the role depicting him as ambitious, cunning and devious, constantly working to curry favour for his family against everyone else and always willing to "motivate" his daughter, Anne, lest Henry lose interest in her. David Robb played Boleyn as a constantly furious, irascible schemer in Wolf Hall.

Styles and honours
Sir Thomas Boleyn KG KB (1523–1525)
 The Rt. Hon. The Viscount Rochford KG KB (1525–1529) 
 The Rt. Hon. The Earl of Wiltshire and of Ormond KG KB (8 December 1529–1539)
Note: on 22 February 1538, the earldom of Ormond was restored to Piers Butler, 8th Earl of Ormond.

See also
Palace of Beaulieu
List of ambassadors from the Kingdom of England to France

Footnotes

 
 
  
 
 

 
 
 
  
 Mackay, Lauren. "The Life and Career of Thomas Boleyn (1477–1539):Courtier, Ambassador, and Statesman" Unpublished PhD Thesis, University of Newcastle Australia, 2018.  
 
 
 
 in JSTOR

External links
Boleyn Family A pedigree of the Boleyn family
 Sir Thomas Boleyn Find A Grave

1470s births
1539 deaths

Year of birth uncertain
Earls of Wiltshire
Ambassadors of England to France
Lords Privy Seal
Knights of the Garter
Treasurers of the Household
15th-century English people
16th-century English diplomats
16th-century English politicians
Thomas
High Sheriffs of Kent
16th-century English nobility
Earls of Ormond (Ireland)
People from Hever, Kent